Moschion (Greek: Μοσχίων) is the name of:

Moschion (tragic poet), Greek tragic poet of the 3rd century BC
Moschion (physician), Greek physician of the 1st century AD or before, known through quotations by other medical writers
Muscio, author of a treatise on gynecology in Latin (ca. AD 500), which was translated into Greek and known under the name Moschion
Minor figures:
Moschion, Athenian sculptor mentioned in Winckelmann's History of Ancient Art
Moschion, notorious parasite mocked by Alexis
Moschion, chef employed by Demetrius Phalereus
Moschion, character in several plays of Menander (including Samia and Perikeiromene)
Moschion, paradoxographer of the 3rd or 2nd century BC (FGrHist 575) whose description of the Syracusia is quoted by Athenaeus
Moschion, father of Daetondas of Sicyon